Richard S. Leaming (July 16, 1828 – May 25, 1895) was an American ship builder and politician from New Jersey who served in both the New Jersey General Assembly and the New Jersey Senate and on the Cape May County Board of Chosen Freeholders.

Leaming was born on July 16, 1828, in South Dennis, New Jersey. His father, Jeremiah Leaming, had also served in the New Jersey Senate.

By profession, Leaming was a ship builder, and was described at the time as having been "successful in his operations".

Leaming became a member of the Republican Party when it was created and represented Dennis Township on the Cape May County Board of Chosen Freeholders in 1862 and from 1869 to 1872. He was elected to both houses of the New Jersey Legislature, serving in the New Jersey General Assembly from 1871 to 1873 and in the New Jersey Senate from 1874 to 1876.

He died in Dennisville on May 25, 1895.

References

1828 births
1895 deaths
American shipbuilders
County commissioners in New Jersey
Republican Party members of the New Jersey General Assembly
Republican Party New Jersey state senators
People from Dennis Township, New Jersey
Politicians from Cape May County, New Jersey
19th-century American politicians